U.S. Route 85 (US 85) is a part of the U.S. Highway System that travels from the Mexican border in El Paso, Texas, north to the Canadian border in Fortuna, North Dakota. In the U.S. state of Colorado, US 85 begins at the New Mexico state line south of Starkville and ends at the Wyoming state line south of Cheyenne, Wyoming.

Route description

US 85 enters Colorado from New Mexico concurrent with Interstate 25 (I-25) but is not signed. US 85 leaves I-25 at exit 128 and follows Santa Fe Avenue through Fountain before turning west briefly onto Lake Avenue before rejoining I-25 at exit 138. Approaching the south side of Denver, US 85 again leaves I-25 at exit 184. From there it heads west and north as a two-lane rural highway. It becomes an expressway near Chatfield Reservoir and the southern Denver suburbs of Littleton and Englewood, where it is commonly known as Santa Fe Drive. From just north of its intersection with C-470 to its northern intersection with I-25, it is known as the Navy SEAL Danny Dietz Memorial Highway. It continues north through Denver for a few miles before once again joining with I-25 at mile marker 207. There it runs concurrently with US 87 as well as I-25 and heads north through downtown Denver. At exit 214, US 85 turns east and runs concurrently with I-70 and US 6 for about a mile where it exits with US 6 and heads northeast through Commerce City. In just a few miles the US 6/US 85 concurrency merges with I-76 at mile marker 9. They travel concurrently for  until exit 12 when US 85 becomes an expressway and continues north out of the Denver area through Brighton. From there it parallels I-25 for about  passing through Fort Lupton, Platteville, Evans, Greeley, and Eaton before crossing into Wyoming.

History

US 85 originally followed the route that I-25 would later take. In southern Colorado, US 85 originally was placed on city streets in Pueblo and Trinidad until 1938 where the route was ultimately paved from one state to another, taking place at the present I-25 corridor.

Realignment
Starting in 1942, a realignment project took place in northeastern Denver, involving the opening of Vasquez Blvd. Originally, US 85 ran along Brighton Blvd. from downtown going northeast and then was realigned along 46th Ave. to Vasquez Blvd. Five years later, in Pueblo, the route took the downtown streets before the Greenhorn/Crow bypass opened two years later. In 1950, the Palmer Lake/Larkspur bypass opened, moving US 85 along with US 87 along the expressway. The expressway opened north of Pueblo in 1951, which allowed both US 85 and US 87 to use the expressway coming out of downtown until 1954.

On October 1, 2007, part of the US-85 known as Nevada Ave was relinquished and is now maintained by the City of Colorado Springs.

Junction list

Related routes

US 85 has three current business routes in Colorado: one in Fort Lupton, one in Platteville, and one in Greeley.

See also

 List of U.S. Highways in Colorado

References

External links

Transportation in Las Animas County, Colorado
Transportation in Huerfano County, Colorado
Transportation in Pueblo County, Colorado
Transportation in El Paso County, Colorado
Transportation in Douglas County, Colorado
Transportation in Arapahoe County, Colorado
Transportation in Denver
Transportation in Adams County, Colorado
Transportation in Weld County, Colorado
85
 Colorado